Kee Tas Kee Now Tribal Council is a Tribal Council representing First Nation communities in north-central Alberta, Canada. The council is based in Atikameg, Alberta.

Member First Nations
Current First Nation members are:
 Loon River First Nation
 Lubicon Lake Band
 Peerless Trout First Nation
 Whitefish Lake First Nation
 Woodland Cree First Nation

References

External links
 Kee Tas Kee Now Tribal Council website

First Nations tribal councils
Organizations based in Alberta
First Nations in Alberta